Global Telecom Holding S.A.E. (GTH; formerly Orascom Telecom Holding) is a holding company based in Amsterdam, and a subsidiary of the multinational telecommunications services company VEON. GTH previously owned mobile network operators in multiple countries. Its sole business unit  is the Algerian mobile provider Djezzy.

Operations 
Global Telecom Holding (GTH) is operating in Algeria (Djezzy) serving more than 15 million customers after it has sold its mobile operations in Pakistan and Bangladesh in 2019. Global Telecom has delisted from the EGX Egyptian Exchange and is based in Amsterdam, Netherlands.

History 
In 1997, Orascom Telecom Holding (OTH) was established as a separate entity to consolidate the telecommunications and technology interests of the Orascom group of companies established in 1976. Founded in 1998 as part of the Orascom company, it became the largest cellular operator in the Middle East in only five years.
 
In 2010, Russian Vimpelcom acquired Orascom Telecom as well as Wind Telecomunicazioni from Weather Investments of the Egyptian entrepreneur Naguib Sawiris and merged the two companies to form Global Telecom Holding based in Cairo. Excluded from this transaction were the activities in North Korea (Koryolink) and Egypt, which were transferred to Orascom Telecom Media and Technology Holding, which remained majority-owned by Naguib Sawiris. The Italian activities of Wind Telecomunicazioni report directly to the parent company Vimpelcom and are not part of Global Telecom Holding.

Orascom Telecom Holding has been renamed to Global Telecom Holding in 2013. On 1 July 2019 Gerbrand Nijman (since June 2015 GTH's group CFO) has succeeded Vincenzo Nesci (retired) as GTH's CEO.

References

External links
 Global Telecom

Companies based in Amsterdam
Holding companies of the Netherlands
VEON
1998 establishments in Egypt